Avenue X may refer to:

Avenue X, an album by The Turbo A.C.'s
Avenue X (street), a street in Brooklyn
Avenue X (IND Culver Line), a station on the IND Culver Line of the New York City Subway